Lancing railway station is in Lancing in the county of West Sussex, England. It is  down the line from Brighton. The station is operated by Southern.

Platform 1 is for trains to Brighton and London Victoria, and Platform 2 is for trains to Worthing, Portsmouth Harbour and Southampton.

The station has 1 ticket office located on Platform 2, and 3 self-service ticket machines, two on Platform 1 and one outside the front of the main station building adjoining Platform 2.

There are ticket barriers at this station,  in operation from 6 am until midnight every day.  Additional ticket checks are carried out at the exits from the platforms, by Southern Railway staff and Rail Neighbourhood Officers.

History
In 2020, platform 2 was extended, allowing it to accommodate 8-carriage trains.

Services
Off-peak, all services at Lancing are operated by Southern using  EMUs.

The typical off-peak service in trains per hour is:
 1 tph to  via 
 2 tph to 
 1 tph to 
 1 tph to 
 1 tph to 

During the peak hours, the station is served by a small number of direct trains between Brighton and Littlehampton.

References

External links

Adur District
Railway stations in West Sussex
DfT Category D stations
Former London, Brighton and South Coast Railway stations
Railway stations in Great Britain opened in 1845
Railway stations served by Govia Thameslink Railway